Consummation is the third studio album by American musician Katie Von Schleicher. It was released on May 22, 2020 under Ba Da Bing Records.

Critical reception
Consummation was met with "generally favorable" reviews from critics. At Metacritic, which assigns a weighted average rating out of 100 to reviews from mainstream publications, this release received an average score of 79, based on 8 reviews.

Track listing

References

2020 albums
Ba Da Bing Records albums